Kadi is both a surname and a given name. Notable people with the name include:

Surname:
Abdussalam Al Qadi, Libyan politician 
Calvin Kadi (born 1982), South African football player
Eddie Kadi (born 1983), British comedian, presenter, actor and MC
Evdokia Kadi (born 1981), Greek Cypriot singer
Nicholas Kadi (born 1952), Turkish-born Iraqi American actor

Given name:
Kadi Pärnits (born 1965), Estonian politician, lawyer and trade union leader
Kadi Sesay (born 1949), Sierra Leonean politician

See also
Kady (given name)
Cady (given name)
Cadi (disambiguation)